Neha Parikh is an Indian-American business executive. In June 2021, Parikh became CEO of Waze, a subsidiary of Google. Prior to becoming CEO of Waze, Neha was the President of Hotwire within the Expedia Group until 2020. Neha currently serves as a Member of the Board of Directors for Carvana.

Career

Hotels.com
Parikh joined Hotels.com in 2008 as a Product Manager. She was eventually promoted to Senior Vice President, Hotels.com Global Brands & Retail in 2015. In 2017, Parikh became President of Hotwire, which is part of the Expedia Group, a role she served in until 2020. At the time, Parikh was Hotwire’s youngest and first female president.

Carvana
Parikh joined the Board of Directors of Carvana in April 2019.

Waze
When Parikh joined Waze as CEO in June 2021, she replaced Noam Bardin, who stepped down in November as the CEO after leading the Israeli company for 12 years. She was removed from the role in December 2022 upon the organizational merger between Waze and Google Maps.

Education 
Parikh holds a bachelor's degree from the University of Texas and a Master of Business Administration from the Kellogg School of Management.

Personal life 
Neha is married and lives with her husband in New York City.

References 

Living people
American people of Indian descent
American businesspeople
Kellogg School of Management alumni
University of Texas at Austin alumni
21st-century American women
1980 births